Swampy Lake 236 is an Indian reserve of the Loon River First Nation in Alberta, located within Northern Sunrise County. It is 6 kilometres west of Loon Lake.

References

Indian reserves in Alberta
Loon River First Nation